"You Alone (Solo Tu)" is a popular song.

The music was written by Robert Allen, the lyrics by Al Stillman. The song was published in 1953.

The best-known recordings were made by Perry Como, who recorded the song twice, in 1953 and in 1961.

The first recording, made on August 19, 1953, was released in the United States by RCA Victor with catalog number 20-5447-B (78 rpm) and 47-5447-B (45 rpm), with the flip side "Pa-Paya Mama", and reached #9 on the Billboard charts. In the United Kingdom, it was issued by HMV, as a 78rpm single (catalog number B-10624) in January, 1954 (with the flip side "Surprisin'").

The later recording, made May 17, 1961, was issued as a track on the 1961 album Sing to Me Mr. C. (RCA Victor catalog number LSP-2390 )

1953 songs
Songs with music by Robert Allen (composer)
Songs with lyrics by Al Stillman